Thomas Banton (born 11 November 1998) is an English cricketer. He made his international debut for the England cricket team in November 2019.

Domestic and franchise career
Banton made his Twenty20 cricket debut for Somerset in the 2017 NatWest t20 Blast on 16 July 2017. He made his first-class debut for Somerset in the 2018 County Championship on 18 September 2018. In 2019, he became a regular in all three formats, scoring two centuries in Somerset's victorious Royal London One-Day Cup campaign as well as a maiden T20 century against Kent in the Vitality Blast.

Banton was signed by Brisbane Heat in the Australian Big Bash League for the 2019/20 season. In December 2019, he was drafted by Pakistan Super League (PSL) franchise team Peshawar Zalmi as their Diamond Category pick at the 2020 PSL draft. Later the same month, in the 2020 IPL auction, he was bought by the Kolkata Knight Riders ahead of the 2020 Indian Premier League. Banton was set to play for the Brisbane Heat in the 2020–21 Big Bash League, but pulled out of the tournament on 5 December 2020.

In April 2022, he was bought by the Welsh Fire for the 2022 season of The Hundred. In July 2022, in the County Championship match against Essex, Banton scored his maiden century in first-class cricket.

International career
In December 2017, he was named in England's squad for the 2018 ICC Under-19 Cricket World Cup. 

In September 2019, Banton was named in England's Twenty20 International (T20I) squad for their series against New Zealand. He made his T20I debut for England, against New Zealand, on 5 November 2019. The following month, Banton was named in England's One Day International (ODI) squad for their series against South Africa. He made his ODI debut on 4 February 2020, for England against South Africa.

On 29 May 2020, Banton was named in a 55-man group of players to begin training ahead of international fixtures starting in England following the COVID-19 pandemic. On 9 July 2020, Banton was included in England's 24-man squad to start training behind closed doors for the ODI series against Ireland. On 27 July 2020, Banton was named in England's squad for the ODI series.

References

External links
 

1998 births
Living people
Cricketers from Buckinghamshire
English cricketers
England One Day International cricketers
England Twenty20 International cricketers
Somerset cricketers
Brisbane Heat cricketers
Kolkata Knight Riders cricketers
Peshawar Zalmi cricketers
Quetta Gladiators cricketers
Welsh Fire cricketers
Colombo Stars cricketers